The 1965 Houston Oilers season was the sixth season for the Houston Oilers as a professional AFL franchise; The team matched their previous output of 4–10 and failed to qualify for the playoffs for the third consecutive season.  The Oilers moved their home games from Jeppensen Stadium to Rice Stadium.

The 1965 Oilers surrendered 5.29 rushing yards per carry, the most in American Football League history, and 8th-most in the history of professional football.

Roster

Schedule

Standings

References

Houston Oilers seasons
Houston Oilers
Houston